Emagine Entertainment Inc. is an American movie theater chain based in Troy, Michigan, operating 28 cinemas in Michigan, Illinois, Indiana, Minnesota, and Wisconsin. Emagine is ranked as the 9th largest theatre chain in North America.

Emagine offers luxury seating in all of their theatres, as well as reserved seats and alcoholic beverages for adults.

History

The company began in 1997 and it was first known as Cinema Hollywood (now known as Emagine Birch Run) where they branched off to be known as Emagine Entertainment.

In 2016, Emagine expanded into Minnesota, acquiring Muller Family Theatres, with eight locations in the Twin Cities metro area. Six of Muller's theaters were renovated and rebranded as Emagine in 2016, followed by the Rogers and Monticello locations a year later. Emagine opened a ninth Minnesota location in Eagan in 2019.

Emagine expanded into Illinois with a location in Frankfort in late 2016. Two years later in 2018, the chain expanded into Wisconsin, opening a theater near Lake Geneva on August 28th.

In 2021, Emagine purchased four former Goodrich Quality Theaters in Kochville Township, Michigan; Batavia, Illinois; Portage, Indiana; and Noblesville, Indiana.

Emagine opened their first sports lounge in their Royal Oak, Michigan location in December 2021, with free admission and WiFi access for online gambling.

See also
 Movie theater

External links

References

Movie theatre chains in the United States
Companies based in Troy, Michigan
1997 establishments in Michigan